Rockport-Fulton High School is a public high school in Rockport, Texas, United States, located on the Texas Gulf Coast. It is the only high school in the Aransas County Independent School District and classified as a 4A school by the UIL. In 2019, the school was rated as a "B" by the Texas Education Agency. Parts of the school collapsed in August 2017 due to Hurricane Harvey.

Its new gymnasium, built for $1 million donated by Ellen DeGeneres and Lowe's Home Improvement,  has a capacity of 1,000 and opened in the fall of September 2019.

Athletics
The Rockport-Fulton Pirates compete in the following sports 

 Cross Country
Band
 Volleyball
 Football
 Basketball
 Powerlifting
 Soccer
 Golf
 Tennis
 Track
 Softball
 Baseball

Notable alumni
Dat Nguyen – Former NFL player for the Dallas Cowboys
Daniel Rakowitz (born in 1960) – A 1980 graduate of Rockport-Fulton High School who went on to become nicknamed the "Butcher of Tompkins Square"
Guy Clark - American country and folk singer, musician, songwriter, recording artist, and performer.
Tammie Brown - Drag queen best known for appearing on the first seasons of RuPaul’s Drag Race and RuPaul's Drag Race All Stars.

References

External links
 Aransas County ISD

Schools in Aransas County, Texas
Public high schools in Texas
Educational institutions established in 1884
1884 establishments in Texas